Royal Academy Language School is situated on Sakkara Road/Marrioteya in Giza (Cairo), approximately 400 meters from the main road. Its premises are surrounded by farm fields.

The school offers education from Nursery (aged 2) through Secondary education (Thanaweya Amma Arabic: ثانويةعامة). The school follows the Egyptian National Curriculum – English Language Arts, Arabic, Math, Science, Social Studies and Religion (Islam or Christianity). Apart from Arabic, Religion and Social Studies all subjects are taught through the medium of English language. In addition, the school sets its own curriculum supplemented by books of British publishers. Starting from First Primary children choose a second language - either French or German. Library, Music, Art, Home Economics, Technology and Computer classes are also offered on a regular basis.

External links 
 Official website

Private schools in Cairo
Schools in Cairo
2003 establishments in Egypt
Educational institutions established in 2003